The Maine Service Employees Association (formerly Maine State Employees Association) is a public sector trade union in the U.S. state of Maine. It has been part of the Service Employees International Union (SEIU Local 1989) since 1988, though it formed earlier. Its newspaper is called the Maine Stater. MSEA SEIU 1989 voted to change their name from Maine State Employees Association to Maine Service Employees Association.

See also
 Locke v. Karass

References

External links
 Official site

Service Employees International Union
Trade unions in Maine
State wide trade unions in the United States